Michael S. Purzycki (born 1945) is an American businessman and politician currently serving as the 56th 
Mayor of Wilmington, Delaware. Prior to serving as Mayor, Purzycki served as the executive director of the Riverfront Development Corporation and helped redevelop the Wilmington Riverfront. Originally from Newark, New Jersey, Purzycki attended the University of Delaware and had a short National Football League career for the New York Giants in the 1967–1968 season.

Early life
Purzycki was born in Newark, New Jersey in 1945. He graduated from Seton Hall Preparatory School in 1963 and received a football scholarship to the University of Delaware. While at the University of Delaware, he played football for four years and set every Delaware Fightin' Blue Hens football receiving record. Purzycki graduated from the University of Delaware with a degree in history.  After college, Purzycki signed a contract to play for the New York Giants in the National Football League for the 1967–1968 season; however, his football career was cut short by injury. In 1968, Purzycki moved to Delaware.

After moving to Delaware, Purzycki worked in real estate and attended Delaware Law School at night. Purzycki graduated from law school and was admitted to the Delaware bar. He would serve as an attorney for the Delaware Senate and would continue to practice law for more than a decade.

Political career
In 1982, Purzycki was elected to the New Castle Council. While serving on County Council, Purzycki spent nine years as Chairman of the council's Finance Committee and wrote the legislation that would become Delaware's first ethics law.

Purzycki was chosen as the executive director of the Riverfront Development Corporation in 1996. Under this role, he would be responsible for helping redevelop the blighted Riverfront area of Wilmington. Under his tenure, Purzycki turned the former industrial Riverfront into a destination for recreation and dining. He turned $350 million in public funding into a $1 billion private investment and brought over 1,400 residents and 6,000 employees to the Riverfront. Purzycki later served as chairman of the Wilmington Hope Commission, where he oversaw the opening of the Achievement Center in 2014. The Achievement Center helps former prisoners transition back into the community.
 
In 2016, Purzycki ran for Mayor of Wilmington. On September 13, 2016, Purzycki won the Democratic primary with 23.6% of the vote, defeating incumbent Mayor Dennis P. Williams and six other candidates. He was able to bring up his vote totals from voters in his neighborhood in the northwest part of the city. Former Republican Representative and Governor Mike Castle helped Purzycki campaign to Republicans and Independents, with over 1,200 voters in Wilmington switching their voter registration from Republican to Democratic. Purzycki won the general election on November 8, 2016 with 82% of the vote, defeating Republican real estate professional Robert Martin and Independent Democrat teacher Steven Washington. Purzycki was inaugurated as Mayor on January 3, 2017.

Personal life and family
Purzycki lives in the Highlands neighborhood of Wilmington. He married Bette Richitelli in 1984. They have three children - Gage, Adriane, and Mick. Gage lives at home in Wilmington while Adriane and Mick live in New York City.

References

1945 births
Delaware Democrats
Delaware Fightin' Blue Hens football players
Living people
Mayors of Wilmington, Delaware
New York Giants players
Players of American football from Newark, New Jersey
Politicians from Newark, New Jersey
Seton Hall Preparatory School alumni
University of Delaware alumni